National Institute of Technology Tiruchirappalli (NIT Tiruchirappalli or NIT Trichy) is a public technical and research university near the city of Tiruchirappalli in Tamil Nadu, India. It was founded as Regional Engineering College Tiruchirappalli in 1964 by the Governments of India and Tamil Nadu under the affiliation of the University of Madras. The college was granted Deemed University status in 2003 with the approval of the University Grants Commission (UGC), All India Council for Technical Education (AICTE) and Government of India and renamed as National Institute of Technology Tiruchirappalli. The institute is recognized as an Institute of National Importance by the Government of India under the National Institutes of Technology, Science Education and Research (NITSER) Act, 2007 and is one of the members of the National Institutes of Technology (NITs) system, a group of premier Indian technical institutes governed by the Council of NITSER.

NIT Trichy is funded by the Ministry of Education (MoE), Government of India; and focuses exclusively on engineering, management, science, technology and architecture. The institute offers 10 bachelor's, 40 master's and 17 doctoral programmes through its 17 academic departments and awards more than 1900 degrees annually. The National Institutional Ranking Framework (NIRF) ranked the institute first among the NITs for seven years in a row from 2016 to 2022. NIRF also ranked the institute 5 for architecture, 8 for engineering, 3 for management and 23 overall among the academic institutions in India in 2022. NIT Trichy was titled the "Best Industry-linked Centrally Funded Technical Institution in India" by the Confederation of Indian Industry in 2015, and "University of the Year" by the Federation of Indian Chambers of Commerce and Industry in 2017.


History 

Pandit Jawaharlal Nehru, who was the prime minister of India from 1947 to 1964, wanted India to become a world leader in science and technology. Under his administration, the central government started fourteen regional engineering colleges (RECs) between 1959 and 1965 at several cities in India. The REC at Tiruchirappalli was established in 1964 under the affiliation of the University of Madras, as a co-operative venture between the Government of India and the Government of Tamil Nadu.

The founder of the college was Prof. P.S. Manisundaram, a pioneering educationist in India. He was a graduate of Loyola College, Chennai and the Technical University of Nova Scotia (now part of Dalhousie University), Canada. He served as the principal of REC Tiruchirappalli from its formation in 1964 to 1982.

In the early 1980s, the state government began to find the logistics of controlling these colleges from Madras to be tedious and split the aegis into the Bharathidasan and Bharathiar universities for the Tiruchirappalli and Coimbatore areas, respectively. In 1982, the college was thus incorporated under the Bharathidasan University umbrella, of which Dr. P.S. Manisundaram served as the inaugural vice-chancellor. The institute would grant degrees under this name for the next 20 years, except for a brief stint under Anna University in 2001 and 2002. The college continued its progress under Bharathidasan University.

In 2001, Anna University was granted authority over REC Tiruchirappalli. This was temporary, however, as the 40-year collaboration between the central and the state governments for all the RECs finally dissolved; the central government upgraded all the RECs to NITs and completely took control of them under the Ministry of Human Resource Development (now known as the Ministry of Education). In 2002, former minister of human resource development Murali Manohar Joshi decided to upgrade the RECs to NITs. At the end of that very same year, the institution was granted deemed university status with the approval of the UGC and AICTE; it was renamed the National Institute of Technology Tiruchirappalli and was finally granting degrees under its own name. In 2007, the National Institutes of Technology Act (now known as the NITSER Act) was passed, which declared NITs as Institutes of National Importance along the lines of the Indian Institutes of Technology (IITs).

NIT Trichy celebrated its golden jubilee anniversary on July 19 and 20, 2014, with the president of India Shri Pranab Mukherjee presiding over the event as the chief guest.

Campus

Main Zone 
The campus spans  and is one of the largest academic campuses in India. The main entrance is located on the southern end of the campus, facing National Highway 67. There is one other entrance, popularly called the Staff Gate. The institute's academic facilities are located in the southern half of the campus; these include the department buildings, laboratories and workshops, lecture halls, computer centres and the central library. The campus has separate buildings for the departments of nine engineering, architecture, management, computer applications, energy and environment engineering.

Administrative building 
The administrative building with its clock tower is one of the institute's landmarks. This building houses the administrative offices and also the offices of the director and deans. The eastern and western wings of this building were occupied by the physics and chemistry departments respectively prior to the opening of new building buildings for the same departments in 2016.

Orion 
The Orion is the lecture hall complex for the undergraduate students and consists of twenty-four large lecture halls. Each hall can accommodate around two hundred students and consists of projectors and televisions to make the lectures interactive. The shape of the Orion building is number eight. A decommissioned MIG-23 jet, presented by the Indian Air Force to the institute, is installed near the Orion building.

Central library 
NIT Trichy has a modern central library with more than two and a half lakh of documents consisting of technical books, reports, standards, compact disks and back volumes of journals. The library subscribes to more than two hundred print periodicals, more than five thousand e-Journals and more than six hundred e-books besides a holding of around eighteen thousand back volumes of journals. The library also contains around two lakh books in the Book Bank scheme. The institute is holding membership with British Council Library, Chennai. They are also holding membership with Developing Library Network, New Delhi and providing Inter-Library Loan services to the users. The library also provides air-conditioned and Wi-Fi enabled reading halls. It is situated opposite to the civil engineering department building. The building also houses the Centre for Entrepreneurial Development and Incubation (CEDI). The old library building temporarily houses the Indian Institute of Management, Tiruchirappalli.

Octagon centre 
The Octagon is the institute's primary computer centre, with eight computer labs, printing facilities and a variety of engineering software for use by students. The Octagon also serves as a central hub for interconnecting the campus-wide LAN. This LAN caters to totally six thousand users across the campus and has a 10 Gbit/s fibre optic backbone. The original facility, opened in 1990, was extended into the second building in 2006; there are plans to further expand the facility in view of the increase in student enrollment. A brand new computer centre was inaugurated in the year 2016 which houses more than three hundred computers.

Residential zone 
Residential facilities are provided on campus for students, faculty and staff of the institute. Most students live on campus in the residential hostels. In all, there are twenty-two boys' and five girls' hostels with a capacity of five thousand students. With the exception of the girls' hostel, all the others are located on the northern side of the campus. Meals are served by two mega messes and two government messes along with a pure vegetarian mess located on campus. There are several cafeterias on campus where food is available for purchase. Other amenities on campus include a guest house, a modern hospital, an Apollo pharmacy, an India Post office, State Bank of India and its two ATMs, one Canara Bank ATM, Cafe Coffee day restaurant, Naturals parlor and one supermarket.

The institute has a student activity centre (SAC) and is the hub for most of the major extra-curricular activities. The SAC building was inaugurated in the year 2012. The dance, music and the National Cadet Corps groups carry out all their activities at the SAC. It also houses the Café Coffee Day restaurant.

Organisation

Academic departments 
The institute has 17 departments.

Management School 
The NIT Trichy's Department of Management Studies (DoMS) is one of the oldest business schools in India, started in 1978 and offers MBA programme. They offered Dual specialisation in Marketing, Finance, Business Analytics and IT Consulting, Human Resources and Operations. Unlike the rest of the courses in the university, DoMS follows a trimester pattern with a two-month compulsory internship at the end of the first year. In 2012, the department was named "Outstanding Business School in South India" in the Bloomberg UTV awards.

Governance 

The president of India is the ex officio visitor of all the NITs. The Council of NITSER (formerly NIT Council) works directly under the president and it includes the minister-in-charge of technical education in Central Government, the chairmen and the directors of all the NITs, the chairman of the University Grants Commission, the director-general of the Council of Scientific and Industrial Research, the directors of other selected central institutions of repute, members of Parliament, the joint council secretary of the Ministry of Education, nominees of the Central Government, the All India Council for Technical Education and the visitor.

Below the NIT Council is each NIT's board of governors. The board of governors of each NIT consists of the chairman and ten members, which include government, industry, alumni and faculty representation.

The director serves under the board of governors and is the school's chief academic and executive officer. Academic policies are decided by its Senate, which is composed of some professors and other representatives. The Senate controls and approves the curriculum, courses, examinations, and results. Senate committees examine specific academic matters. The teaching, training, and research activities of various departments of the institute are periodically reviewed to maintain educational standards. The director is the ex officio chairman of the Senate. The deputy director is subordinate to the director. Together they manage the deans, heads of departments, the registrar, the president of the Students' Council, and the chairman of the Hall Management Committee. Deans and heads of departments in NITs are administrative postings rather than career paths. Faculty members serve as deans and heads of departments for limited periods, typically two to three years, then returning to regular faculty duties. The registrar is the chief administrative officer and overviews day-to-day operations. Below the head of department, are the various faculty members (professors, assistant professors, and lecturers). The warden serves under the chairman of the Hall Management Committee.

Academics 
NIT Trichy offers undergraduate and postgraduate programmes in disciplines spanning engineering, science, arts, architecture and management. The institute has 17 departments with more than 250 faculty members and 6,000 enrolled students. The following explains the academic programmes offered by the institute and their admission procedure:

Undergraduate 
The institute awards Bachelor of Technology (B.Tech.) degrees in nine engineering disciplines as well as the Bachelor of Architecture (B.Arch.) degree through its architecture discipline. The B.Tech. and B.Arch. degree programmes are four and five years long respectively.

Admission for Indian candidates to the undergraduate programmes is highly competitive and is based on the rank secured in the Joint Entrance Examination – Main (JEE Main) and selection through the Joint Seat Allocation Authority (JoSAA) and Central Seat Allocation Board (CSAB). To be eligible for admission in the undergraduate programmes, the candidates in the general category have to secure at least 75% marks or be in the top 20 percentile and the candidates in the Scheduled Castes (SC) and Scheduled Tribes (ST) category have to secure at least 65% in the 12th class examination conducted by the respective Boards. The JEE Main is considered to be one of the toughest examinations in the world and the high school science students who clear the examination with top ranks generally opt NIT Trichy as their first choice for admissions in undergraduate programmes. Admission for Foreign Nationals, Children of Indian Workers in the Gulf Countries (CIWG), Persons of Indian Origin (PIOs), Non-Resident Indians (NRIs) and Overseas Citizen of India (OCI) in the undergraduate programmes is based on the rank secured in the JEE Main and selection through the online portal of Direct Admission of Students Abroad (DASA).

Postgraduate 
The institute offers 40 master's programmes, which include 23 programmes leading to Master of Technology (M.Tech.) degrees, 9 programmes in engineering leading to Master of Science (M.S.) by research degrees, 4 programmes in science and computer science leading to Master of Science (M.Sc.) degrees and a programme in architecture, arts, computer applications and business leading to Master of Architecture (M.Arch), Master of Arts (M.A.),  Master of Computer Applications (MCA) and Master of Business Administration (MBA) respectively.

To be eligible for admission to the postgraduate programmes, the candidate has to secure a minimum percentage or CGPA set by the institute or admission authorities of the government of India in the qualifying degree from a university or an institute recognized by the Association of Indian Universities or similar Indian body. Admission to the M.Tech. and M.Arch. programmes is based on the merit list prepared by the Centralized Counseling for M.Tech./M.Arch./M.Plan./M.Des. (CCMT) on the basis of Graduate Aptitude Test in Engineering (GATE) scores as well as selection through CCMT online portal. Admission to the M.S. by research programmes is based on the GATE score and personal interview conducted by the institute. Admission to the M.Sc. programmes is based on the merit list prepared by the Centralized Counselling for M.Sc./M.Sc.(Tech.) (CCMN) on the basis of the ″Common Percentile″ (calculated from the Joint Admission Test for Masters (JAM) Rank) and selection through the CCMN online portal. Admission to the MCA programme is based on the rank secured in the NIT MCA Common Entrance Test (NIMCET) and selection through the NIMCET online portal. Admission to the M.A. programme is through the interview conducted by the institute. Admission to the MBA programme is through the rank secured in the Common Admission Test and personal interviews conducted by the institute.

Applicants interested in seeking admission to the postgraduate programmes who are foreign nationals, PIOs, OCIs who have completed undergraduate programme in any country (including India) or Indian nationals who have completed their undergraduate programme outside India or Indian nationals who have acquired NRI status and holding it for the last three years after obtaining undergraduate degree from India or Indian nationals who have completed undergraduate programme in any centrally funded technical institute (CFTI) under the DASA Scheme or Indian nationals who have completed undergraduate programme in India but have completed their 11th and 12th standard (or equivalent) from outside India, are requested to check the admission details in DASA and institute websites.

The institute also offers 17 Doctorate of Philosophy (PhD) degrees programmes. Admissions to the PhD programmes are based on written tests followed by personal interviews conducted by the institute. The doctoral research scholars are given a topic by the professor or work on the consultancy projects sponsored by the industry. Teaching assistantships (TA) and research assistantships (RA) are provided based on the scholar's profile.

Reputation and rankings

General ranking 
Globally, NIT Trichy is ranked 1546 by the Center for World University Rankings (CWUR) in 2022, 801–1000 by the QS World University Rankings (QS) and Times Higher Education World University Rankings (THE) in 2023, and 1413 by the U.S. News & World Report Best Global University Ranking (USNWR) in 2022-2023.

In Asia, the institute is ranked 281–290 by QS in 2023, 301–350 by THE in 2022 and 450 by USNWR in 2022-2023. Also, the institute was ranked 126 in BRICS nations by QS in 2019 and 301–350 in emerging economies by THE in 2022.

In India, the institute is ranked 40 by CWUR in 2022, 21 overall by NIRF in 2022, 27 by QS in 2020 and 41 by USNWR in 2022-2023.

Research performance 
The SCImago Institutions Rankings (SIR), which rank academic and research institutions worldwide on research, innovation and societal factors, ranked the institute 57 among the universities in India, 93 among all sectors in India, 546 among the universities worldwide and 709 among all sectors worldwide in 2022. For research particularly, SIR ranked the institute 54 among the universities in India, 77 among all sectors in India, 388 among the universities worldwide and 442 among all sectors worldwide in 2022. NIRF ranked the institute 23 among the institutions in India for research in 2022.

Subject ranking 
QS ranked the institute 451-500 for electrical and electronic engineering and 501-520 for mechanical engineering among the universities worldwide in 2022.

THE ranked the institute 601-800 for engineering and technology in 2022, 601-800 for physical sciences and 601+ for computer science in 2020 among the universities worldwide.

USNWR ranked the institute 507 for engineering, 657 for materials science, 724 for chemistry and 725 for computer science among the universities worldwide in 2022-2023.

NIRF ranked the institute 5 for architecture, 8 for engineering and 39 for management in India in 2022.

The Week, India Today and Outlook India ranked the institute 10 in 2019, 8 in 2020 and 9 among government colleges in 2021, respectively, for engineering in India.

India Today ranked the institute 48 for management in India in 2020.

Research 
Research at NIT Trichy is sponsored by various Indian government agencies. The departments of the institute also undertake consultancy projects with government agencies. The institute's scientific output averages 700 papers and 10,000 citations per year. In addition, the institute's research community is actively involved in transforming unique concepts into products/processes, and it has several published and issued patents to its name. The institute has signed a memorandum of understanding (MoU) with several academic institutions, governmental organizations, public and private companies to carry out research activities in the institute. The institute's income for sponsored research and consultancy project were more than ₹19 crores and ₹3 crores, respectively, for the financial year 2020–21. Stanford University named 14 researchers from the institute in their world's top 2% scientists list for the year 2020.

Centres of excellence 

The institute has six centres of excellence (CoE), focusing on research and providing consultancy in particular technical fields. The CoE in Corrosion and Surface Engineering specializes in the field of corrosion and surface engineering. The centre offers MS and PhD programmes and has signed MoUs with government agencies, public and private companies. The CoE in Transportation Engineering focuses on research in the areas of Transportation Planning, Intelligent Transportation Systems and Pavement Engineering. The CoE in Manufacturing provides consulting services to businesses in the areas of automation, product development, process improvement, shop floor design, etc. as well as training current employees in cutting-edge technology. The Space Technology Incubation Centre (S-TIC), established by the Indian Space Research Organisation (ISRO) at the campus, fosters startups to develop products and applications alongside industry that will be used for future space missions. It is the first facility of its kind in south India. The S-TIC unites business, academia, and ISRO under one roof, enabling them to support projects related to research and development for the Indian Space Program. The CoE in Artificial Intelligence is focused on interdisciplinary research in Al and attempts to create solutions for crisis management, healthcare, decision support systems, and other areas which have an impact on society. The Centre for Advanced Manufacturing and Automation (CAMA) is a cutting-edge centre in the institute that offers significant technology support to numerous businesses. The center's unique systems include a 3D metal additive manufacturing facility, a Femto laser micro-machining system, a laser shock peening setup, and a high temperature indentation tester.

Centre for Entrepreneurship Development and Incubation 
Centre for Entrepreneurship Development and Incubation (CEDI) is an independent company promoted by NIT Trichy. CEDI was founded in 2012 and registered under Section 8 of the Companies Act. CEDI facilitates the incubated companies to access NIT Trichy's common infrastructure facilities, departmental laboratories and other resources of NIT Trichy for their products development purposes. All the necessary mentoring and support for mobilizing funds, creating access to markets and augmenting managerial skills are provided by the CEDI centre.

CEDI has implemented a project – Technological Incubation and Development of Entrepreneurs (TIDE) funded by the Ministry of Electronics and Information Technology, Government of India, which aims to enable young entrepreneurs to initiate technology start-up companies for commercial exploitation of technologies developed by them in the areas of information and communications technology and electronics. CEDI has implemented faculty and entrepreneurship development programmes for faculty, students and potential and existing entrepreneurs in the Tiruchirappalli region. These programmes are sponsored by the Department of Science and Technology through the Entrepreneurship Development Institute of India.

Student life

Sports 
Most of the institute's athletic facilities are located in and around the sports centre which includes indoor badminton courts and a fitness centre for men. The Opal hostel, which is the girl's hostel also includes a gym. Adjoining this building are a  swimming pool and an outdoor stadium with a  track, which is also used as a cricket field. Other facilities on campus include basketball courts and indoor table tennis tables in the residential hostels. A new indoor sports arena with international standards near to the basketball court was inaugurated in 2014. In 2017, two lawn tennis courts have been built near to basketball court.

Clubs and societies 
NIT Trichy has over 35 student groups spanning a variety of interests, including cultural, social and professional groups, student publications and recreational groups. Undergraduate students participate in one of three national programmes in their first year: the National Cadet Corps, the National Sports Organisation or the National Service Scheme.

The college is a host to many academic societies both national and international. These societies organize several workshops, seminars and guest lectures by eminent personalities in their respective fields, from time to time. They are also responsible for providing opportunities for students to take part in various international events too. The academic society includes IEEE, ACM, ISA and SAE.

The two very popular computing groups are the Delta Force and Spider. The Delta Force is an active group of developers and programmers who are responsible for the maintenance of the institute website and the development, administration, and updating of most of the content on the institute intranet. The Spider group offers various services such as organizing various courses (c language, web designing etc.), blog hosting, providing short message services and now even the facility to check train reservation status.

The hobby groups include RMI, Vox Lumos, Cinema Paradiso and PSI. The RMI (Robotics and Machines Intelligence) is the on-campus robotics group, primarily involved in the development of robotics enthusiasm amongst the students. The group is responsible for holding workshops and organizing competition events in electronics.

The fine arts groups include the Dance Troupe (dance club), Music Troupe (music club), Thespians' Society (drama club) and Visual Arts Club. These groups have won various awards in several events conducted in different colleges held around the country.

There are several Language Clubs which cater to the needs of native speakers. Aayaam (The Hindi Club of NIT Trichy) conducts many Literary events in all major college fests, the flagship event "Umang" conducted every year for the celebration of "Hindi Divas", It also organizes "Dandiya Night" during Navratri and publishes a yearly magazine called "Pratibimb", It also organizes Hindi learning classes for non-Hindi speakers who show a keen interest in learning the language. Tamil Mandram (Tamil language promoting club) plays a very important role in promoting Tamil amongst the students by organizing various programs, Tamil events in cultural festivals and also book fairs where classics are available at subsidized prices.

Annual events

Festember 

Festember is the annual national-level cultural festival of the institute. Held every year since 1975 during the month of September, this event encompasses music, dance and literary competitions, with thousands of participants from colleges all over the country vying for the trophy. The event has seen performances by Indian musicians including Karthik, Srinivas, Naresh Iyer, Kadri Gopalnath, Sivamani and Benny Dayal as well as bands like Indian Ocean, Euphoria and Silk Route. 'ProNites' or 'ProShows', Festember's most anticipated events, usually form the grand finale after the valediction ceremony. Also on the agenda are the various literary competitions split up between English, Hindi and Tamil, along with the cultural and arts events. Festember derives its name from the phrase, "A Fest to Remember" and not from "A-Fest in September" as is popularly believed due to its falling in the month of September every year.

Pragyan 

Pragyan, the ISO 9001 & 20121 certified annual international techno-management organization of the NIT Trichy, ever since its inception in 2005, has served as a golden platform that attracts brilliant and innovative minds every year from nearly 100 colleges across the country to come and showcase their technical and managerial prowess. Since then it has broadened its horizon and forayed into the international arena by bagging the credit of being the first student-run organization in the world to get an ISO 20121:2012 certification for Sustainable Event Management and also by organizing online programming contests that attracts participation from 60 countries. It has more than 47 events spanning across eight genres. The guest lecture series, every year, sees eminent and famous intellectuals from all walks of life ranging from Marshall Strabala (studio architect of “Burj Khalifa”) to Tessy Thomas (project director of Agni-IV missile) to Jeff Lieberman (host of the show Time Warp on Discovery Channel) to Jimmy Wales (co-founder of Wikipedia).

Nittfest 
Nittfest is the annual inter-departmental cultural competition of the institute. It is usually conducted in March or generally before Pragyan. During Nittfest, departments square off against each other over four days to battle over various events like quizzes, debates, music, dance, drama, gaming, art etc.

Sports Fete 
Sports Fete is the annual inter-departmental sports competition of the institute. It is usually conducted in September. The competition is among the departments competing in various indoor and outdoor sports. Events like athletics, football, cricket and hockey have more points to score. The department with the highest total points wins the Sports Fete trophy. The Mechanical Engineering Department has won the most titles, beating the Computer Science Department by a marginal difference.

Department festivals 
Every academic department of NIT Trichy conducts a symposium every year which is a kind of technical festival. Spread over two days, the symposiums usually include paper presentations, guest lectures, workshops and various other events pertaining to the central theme each department has decided on for the year.

The symposiums conducted by the various academic departments are Alchemy (chemical engineering), Archcult (architecture), Bizzdom (management studies), Currents (electrical and electronics engineering), Inphynitt (Physics), Mettle (metallurgical and materials engineering), Moments (civil engineering), Probe (electronics and communication engineering), Prodigy (production engineering), Sensors (instrumentation and control engineering), Synergy (mechanical engineering), Version (computer applications), Vortex (computer science and engineering).

Notable alumni 

National Institute of Technology, Tiruchirappalli alumni include Chief Executive Officers and top executives of Fortune India 500 and Forbes Global 2000 companies such as Natarajan Chandrasekaran, chairman of Tata Sons; Rajesh Gopinathan, CEO and managing director of Tata Consultancy Services; T. V. Narendran, CEO and managing director of Tata Steel; K. R. Sridhar, CEO and founder of Bloom Energy and R. Ravimohan, former executive director of Reliance Industries.

In the academic world, they include deans and chairs of faculties such as Nagi Naganathan, president of the Oregon Institute of Technology; Guruswami Ravichandran, chair of the Division of Engineering and Applied Science and Professor of Aerospace and Mechanical Engineering at the California Institute of Technology; Ramesh R. Rao, director of the California Institute for Telecommunications and Information Technology and Professor of Electrical and Computer Engineering at the University of California, San Diego; Nambirajan Seshadri, Professor of Practice of Electrical and Computer Engineering at the University of California, San Diego; Rajkumar Chellaraj, CFO and associate dean of the Stanford Graduate School of Business; Venkat Selvamanickam, Professor of Mechanical Engineering and Physics, director of the Texas Center for Superconductivity at the University of Houston; and Nagarajan Ranganathan, Distinguished Professor of Computer Science and Engineering at the University of South Florida.

See also 

 National Institutes of Technology

References

External links 

 

 
National Institutes of Technology
Engineering colleges in Tamil Nadu
Universities and colleges in Tiruchirappalli
Business schools in Tamil Nadu
1964 establishments in Madras State
Educational institutions established in 1964
All India Council for Technical Education
Academic institutions formerly affiliated with the University of Madras